Quicksands is a 1923 American silent crime drama film directed by Jack Conway, written by Howard Hawks, and starring Helene Chadwick and Richard Dix. The supporting cast features Alan Hale Sr., Noah Beery Sr. and Jean Hersholt. The film was released on February 28, 1923, by American Releasing Corporation.

Plot 
Lt. Brill, a U.S. Army officer assigned to stop a narcotics ring on the Mexico–United States border, breaks up with his girlfriend after discovering her working as a dancer the drug kingpin 'Silent' Krupz's cantina. However, he discovers she is actually an undercover Secret Service agent working with her father Farrell at the U.S. Customs Service. The three are captured by Krupz but are rescued by the Army.

Cast

Production 
The film was shot both on a studio in Melrose Avenue, Hollywood, and on location in Fort Huachuca, Arizona. Real U.S. Army soldiers, including United States Colored Troops, were used as extras.

After the American Releasing Corporation went out of business, it was purchased by the Paramount Famous Lasky Corporation for re-release as Boots and Saddles. Dix tried to stop the re-release and offered $1 million to be released from his contract with Paramount, but the studio refused.

Preservation
With no prints of Quicksands in any film archives, it is currently a lost film.

References

External links
 
 

1923 films
1920s English-language films
Silent American drama films
1923 drama films
Films directed by Jack Conway
American black-and-white films
American silent feature films
Films about drugs
Films about the illegal drug trade
Films about the United States Secret Service
Films about the United States Army
Films shot in Los Angeles
Films shot in Arizona
1920s American films